Hylocarpa is a monotypic genus of flowering plants belonging to the family Humiriaceae. The only species is Hylocarpa heterocarpa.

Its native range is Northern Brazil.

References

Humiriaceae
Monotypic Malpighiales genera
Taxa named by Adolpho Ducke